Chairville is a rural unincorporated community located along the border of Medford and Southampton townships in Burlington County, New Jersey, United States. The settlement is named for a chair parts factory that operated from 1845 to 1890. Also located in the area were the Peacock Cemetery, a sawmill, and a one-room schoolhouse. Today, the site is located at the intersection of Chairville Road and New Jersey Route 70 and Little Creek.

References

Medford, New Jersey
Southampton Township, New Jersey
Populated places in the Pine Barrens (New Jersey)
Unincorporated communities in Burlington County, New Jersey
Unincorporated communities in New Jersey